The Idle Rich is a 1914 American silent film produced by Sid Films and distributed by Warner's Features. It was directed by Sidney Olcott with Valentine Grant and Arthur Donaldson in the leading roles.

Cast 
 Valentine Grant
 Arthur Donaldson
 James Vincent
 Sidney Olcott

Production notes 
The film was shot in Florida.

External links 
 
 The Idle Rich website dedicated to Sidney Olcott

1914 films
American silent feature films
Films directed by Sidney Olcott
1914 drama films
American black-and-white films
Silent American drama films
1910s American films